In comic books, Maverick may refer to:

 Maverick (Dark Horse), a comics imprint of Dark Horse Comics
 Maverick (G.I. Joe), a fictional character in the G.I. Joe universe
 Maverick (Marvel Comics), a fictional character who appeared in the X-Men comics
 An alias of the fictional character Chris Bradley (comics) in the X-Men comics
 The Mavericks (comics), the New Mexico team of the Fifty State Initiative in Marvel Comics
 Maverick, a 1959 Dell Comics series based on the Maverick TV series (1957-1962)

See also
Maverick (disambiguation)